Dan Lupu (born  March 13, 1983) is a Romanian actor. Born in Botoșani, he graduated the Caragiale National University of Theatre and Film from Bucharest.

Film
2006  Actor - Narcis from Me and Narcis 7 directed by Corina Craja, Media University
2006  Actor - The Pimp from The Awakening 7 directed by Mihai Stănescu, UNATC
2005  Actor - The Detective from The Patient 6 directed by Raluca Jurcovan, Media University
2005  Actor - Bogdan from The Break-up 14 directed by Catrinel Danaiata, UNATC
2005  Actor - Dan from Casting Popescu 39 directed by Gheorghe Preda, UNATC

Theatre
2009 Actor - Ivan Turbinca after the same title story written by Ion Creangă, directed by Ion Sapdaru (National Theatre "Ion Luca Caragiale" Bucharest)
2007 Dancer - The worker from Borders choreography by Sandra Mahvima
2007 Director, Actor - Three from Waiting, the text and the choreography: collective work
2006 Actor - Tuzenbah from Three Sisters by Anton Chekhov, directed by Șerban Puiu and Ștefan Velniciuc (Casandra Theatre Studio, Bucharest)
2006 Actor - Roger from The Two Orphans (musical), E. Mirea and H. Malineanu after the novel 'Two Orphans' written by Adolphe Philippe D'Ennery and Eugene Cormon directed by George Ivașcu (Casandra Theatre Studio, Bucharest)
2006 Actor - Choubert from Will Flowers Bloom Again? a theatre-dance performance after Eugène Ionesco's play The Victims of Duty stage direction and choreography Lorette Enache (Casandra Theatre Studio, Bucharest)
2003-2006 participating in Theatre L.S. Bulandra's show King George's Madness, Alan Bennett directed by Petre Bokor (Bucharest)

Awards
2007 HOP Mangalia, Romania with Three from Waiting (The Award for the Best Performance)
2007 FITUC Festival Casablanca, Morocco with Three from Waiting (The Award for the Best Choreography)
2002 Lyceum Botoșani, Romania with Ivan Vasilevici from Wedding Proposal, Anton Pavlovich Chekhov directed by Mihai Dontu (Best Male Performance)

References

External links
OfficialWebsite: Dan Lupu
PersonalPage: Dan Lupu
CineMagia: Dan Lupu
CineFan: Dan Lupu
OnlineGallery: Dan Lupu - casting

1983 births
Living people
People from Botoșani
Romanian male actors
Caragiale National University of Theatre and Film alumni